Calytrix leschenaultii is a species of flowering plant in the myrtle family Myrtaceae, endemic to the south-west of Western Australia.

Description
Outside the flowering season, this plant is rather plain. The slightly scented, small oval leaves line the spindly shoots in an alternate arrangement, in the same way as many others in the myrtle family. 

The plant comes into its own when in full bloom. The star-like flowers themselves are a vivid purple with white or yellow stamens (fading to red), and appear between June and November in the species' native range.  Plants with white, blue or pink flowers may also be found. The botanical name Calytrix refers to the awns or fine hairs found on the calyx of the flowers. Plants are pollinated by both birds and insects.

Taxonomy
It was first formally described by Johannes Conrad Schauer in 1844 in Plantae Preissianae. He gave it the name Calycothrix leschenaultii. In 1867 George Bentham transferred the species to the genus Calytrix.

Distribution and habitat
Calytrix leschenaultii occurs in the southwest of Australia, roughly west of a line from Kalbarri to Israelite Bay. Its favoured location is open, sandy heathland.

Cultivation
Although rarely seen in cultivation, Calytrix leschenaultii is well able to deal with the extremes of the Australian climate. Given a sunny spot in sandy soil, it can cope with both drought and frost. It is best propagated from cuttings rather than seed.

References

Myrtales of Australia
leschenaultii
Rosids of Western Australia
Taxa named by George Bentham